Tulsa Promenade Mall is a  shopping center located in the Midtown section of Tulsa, Oklahoma. It is anchored by Dillard's, Genesis Health Clubs, Extra Space Storage, and a fourth anchor last occupied by Macy's until March 26, 2017. The mall sits on 22 acres of land.

History
The original structure was built in 1965 as an outdoor shopping center called Southland, anchored by Brown-Dunkin (now Dillard's) and JCPenney. In 1986, the property was rebuilt as an indoor mall, retaining the Dillard's and JCPenney stores as anchors while adding Mervyn's  as a third. Campbell Company developed the original plaza, and Robert B. Aikens converted it to the present-day mall structure.

The next physical renovation to Tulsa Promenade Mall was in 1996 with parking structures on the north and south sides of the center, expansion of Dillard's and addition of Foley's. In 1998 the Hollywood Palace 12 Theatre opened. The 1999 renovation added carpeting, fixtures, additional restrooms. The tenant mix was enhanced significantly over the next few years with the addition of El Chico restaurant and many retail concepts. In 2005, the center was renovated with the addition of a soft play area, indoor fountains and planters, a glass elevator and a newly designed exterior corner consisting of signage and landscaping.

Mervyn's, which occupied two floors on the west end of the mall as an anchor store, closed in 2005. In 2011 approximately 75% of the first floor (of the former Mervyns space) was leased by Sky Fitness, leaving about 25% of the first floor and 100% of the second floor still vacant. In January 2017, Macy's announced that they will be closing the Promenade location by the end of the year; it closed on March 26, 2017.

On August 6, 2017, an EF-2 tornado crossed part of Midtown Tulsa, lying within the area bounded by 41st and 51st streets and Memorial Drive and Sheridan Road. Promenade Mall was affected, but suffered only light roof and structural damage. Stores were able to reopen within two days after the event. No injuries occurred inside the mall, since the tornado struck shortly after 1 AM.

Due to missed mortgage payments and long term maintenance issues, the mall went into receivership in July 2019. Tulsa Promenade was returned to Kohan's ownership in September 2019.

On January 17, 2020, it was announced that JCPenney would also be closing on April 24, 2020 as part of a plan to close 6 stores nationwide which will leave Dillard's and Sky Fitness as the only anchor left.

In 2021, the entire second floor was vacated, with tenants moving to the first floor, relocating outside of the mall, or closing permanently. Dillard's remained open on its second floor, albeit with locked doors to the mall interior.

In June 2022, it was announced that the Tulsa Oilers would be purchasing the former Macy's with plans to convert it to a practice rink as well as opening it to the public to use. The renovation should take about 18 months. The completed facility, named WeStreet Ice Center, will house two ice rinks, a pro shop, full-service restaurant and bar, arcade, party rooms, and office space.

Notes

See also
Eastgate Metroplex
Woodland Hills Mall

References

External links
 Official Mall website

Buildings and structures in Tulsa, Oklahoma
Shopping malls in Oklahoma
Tourist attractions in Tulsa, Oklahoma
Shopping malls established in 1965
Kohan Retail Investment Group